Blaby District Council elections are held every four years. Blaby District Council is the local authority for the non-metropolitan district of Blaby in Leicestershire, England. Since the last boundary changes in 2003, 39 councillors have been elected from 18 wards.

Political control

A Blaby Rural District Council had existed from 1894 to 1974. The district was reformed to become a non-metropolitan district under the Local Government Act 1972, changing its powers and responsibilities, although keeping the same boundaries. The first election to the reformed council was held in 1973, initially operating as a shadow authority before coming into its revised powers on 1 April 1974. Since 1973 political control of the council has been held by the following parties:

Leadership
The leaders of the council since 2004 have been:

Council elections
1973 Blaby District Council election
1976 Blaby District Council election
1979 Blaby District Council election
1983 Blaby District Council election (New ward boundaries)
1987 Blaby District Council election
1991 Blaby District Council election (District boundary changes took place but the number of seats remained the same)
1995 Blaby District Council election
1999 Blaby District Council election
2003 Blaby District Council election (New ward boundaries increased the number of seats by 1)
2007 Blaby District Council election
2011 Blaby District Council election
2015 Blaby District Council election (Some new ward boundaries)
2019 Blaby District Council election

Election results

A dash indicates that the results for a particular election are not available, or that a party did not stand in an election.

By-election results

1995–1999

1999–2003

2003–2007

2007-2011

2019-2023

References

By-election results

External links
Blaby District Council

 
Council elections in Leicestershire
Blaby
District council elections in England